El Kelâa des Sraghna, or Kelaat Sraghna is a province in the Moroccan economic region of Marrakesh-Safi. Its population in 2004 was 754,705. In 2009, its western half was separated to form Rehamna Province.

The major cities and towns are:
El Kelaâ Des Sraghna
Tamallalt
 Laattaouia
 Sidi Rahhal
Assahrij
 Fraita

Subdivisions
The province is divided administratively into the following:

References

 
El Kelâa des Sraghna Province